The 2011 Santos Tour Down Under was the 13th edition of the Tour Down Under stage race. It took place from 18 to 23 January in and around Adelaide, South Australia, and was the first race of the 2011 UCI World Tour. The Tour was preceded by the Cancer Council Classic race, on Sunday, 16 January, that consisted in a circuit of 30 laps around the Rymill Park in Adelaide's East End, totaling .

The race was won by  rider Cameron Meyer, after holding onto the leader's ochre jersey which came from a breakaway stage win on stage four. Meyer's winning margin over runner-up and fellow Australian Matthew Goss – winner of the first stage of the race – was just two seconds, the equal second smallest margin in the race's history. 's Ben Swift – a stage winner on the second and final stages – completed the podium, eight seconds down on Meyer.

In the race's other classifications, overall winner Meyer also guaranteed himself the black jersey for the highest placed rider under the age of 26, and Goss took home the blue jersey for amassing the highest number of points during stages at intermediate sprints and stage finishes. UniSA-Australia rider Luke Roberts won the King of the Mountains classification, with  finishing at the head of the teams classification.

Overall favourites 
The 2011 Tour Down Under was a very exciting race this year as Mark Cavendish of  marked his first appearance ever. Greipel, the leader of  tried to take full advantage of his captaincy and win his third Tour Down Under.

Although he was not expected to be an overall contender, the 2011 Tour marks Lance Armstrong's last race outside the U.S. as a professional cyclist.

Participating teams 

As the Tour Down Under was a UCI World Tour event, all UCI ProTeams were invited automatically and obligated to send a squad.

UCI ProTeams:

Teams awarded a wildcard invitation:

Schedule

Stages

Stage 1, Mawson Lakes to Angaston

Stage 2, Tailem Bend to Mannum

Stage 3, Unley to Stirling

Stage 4, Norwood to Strathalbyn

Stage 5, McLaren Vale to Willunga

Stage 6, Adelaide to Adelaide

Classification leadership 
In the 2011 Tour Down Under, six different jerseys were awarded. For the general classification, calculated by adding each cyclist's finishing times on each stage, and allowing time bonuses for the first three finishers on each stage and in intermediate sprints, the leader received an ochre jersey. This classification was considered the most important of the Tour Down Under, and the winner was considered the winner of the Tour.

Additionally, there was a sprint classification, which awarded a blue jersey. In the sprint classification, cyclists earned points for finishing in the top three in a stage or intermediate sprint, with the top three finishers in the stage getting 8, 6, and 4 points respectively, and the top three in the intermediate sprints getting 6, 4, and 2.

There was also a mountains classification, which awarded a white jersey. In the mountains classifications, points were won by reaching the top of a mountain before other cyclists. Unlike most other cycling events, there was no categorization of climbs as each awards the same points (16, 12, 8, 6, and 4) to the first five riders past the summit.

The fourth jersey represented the young rider classification. This classification awarded a black jersey.

Due to UCI rules limiting the number of jersey awards to four, the above are the only jerseys awarded to riders which were then worn the next day during the stage. But there were two other jerseys. The first was the red jersey for the most aggressive rider. This award was comparable to the combativity award of the Tour de France. While the rider received a red jersey on the podium after the stage, he wore his normal jersey (unless holding one of the above four) in the next stage, with the aggressive rider award indicated by a red bib number.

The sixth and final jersey was for the teams classification. This jersey was not presented on the podiums daily, but it was awarded to the winning team at the end of the Tour. The teams classification was calculated by adding the times of each team's best four riders per stage per day. The jersey was blue.

References

External links
Tour Down Under official website
2011 Tour Down Under at cyclingnews

Tour Down Under
Tour Down Under
2011 in Oceanian sport
Tour